Fabrizio Biondi (born 7 November 1954) is an Italian rower. He competed in the men's single sculls event at the 1976 Summer Olympics.

References

1954 births
Living people
Italian male rowers
Olympic rowers of Italy
Rowers at the 1976 Summer Olympics
Place of birth missing (living people)